Proto-Tai is the reconstructed proto-language (common ancestor) of all the Tai languages, including modern Lao, Shan, Tai Lü, Tai Dam, Ahom, Northern Thai, Standard Thai, Bouyei, and Zhuang. The Proto-Tai language is not directly attested by any surviving texts, but has been reconstructed using the comparative method.

It was reconstructed in 1977 by Li Fang-Kuei and by Pittayawat Pittayaporn in 2009.

Phonology

Consonants
The following table shows the consonants of Proto-Tai according to Li Fang-Kuei's A Handbook of Comparative Tai (1977), considered the standard reference in the field.  Li does not indicate the exact quality of the consonants denoted here as [,  and ], which are indicated in his work as [č, čh, ž] and described merely as palatal affricate consonants.

The table below lists the consonantal phonemes of Pittayawat Pittayaporn's reconstruction of Proto-Tai.: p. 70 Some of the differences are simply different interpretations of Li's consonants: the palatal consonants are interpreted as stops, rather than affricates, and the glottalized consonants are described using symbols for implosive consonants.  However, Pittayaporn's Proto-Tai reconstruction has a number of real differences from Li:
Pittayaporn does not allow for aspirated consonants, which he reconstructs as secondary developments in Southwestern Tai languages (after Proto-Tai split up into different languages).
He also reconstructs a contrastive series of uvular consonants, namely */q/, */ɢ/, and */χ/. No modern dialect preserves a distinct series of uvular consonants. Pittayaporn's reconstruction of the sounds is based on irregular correspondences in differing modern Tai dialects among the sounds /kʰ/, /x/ and /h/, in particular in the Phuan language and the Kapong dialect of the Phu Thai language. The distinction between /kʰ/ and /x/ can be reconstructed from the Tai Dón language. However, words with /x/ in Tai Dón show three different types of correspondences in Phuan and Kapong Phu Thai: some have /kʰ/ in both languages, some have /h/ in both, and some have /kʰ/ in Phuan but /h/ in Kapong Phu Thai. Pittayaporn reconstructs the correspondence classes as reflecting Proto-Tai /x/,  and /q/, respectively.

There is a total of 33-36 consonants, 10-11 consonantal syllable codas and 25-26 tautosyllabic consonant clusters.

Tai languages have many fewer possible consonants in coda position than in initial position. Li (and most other researchers) construct a Proto-Tai coda inventory that is identical with the system in modern Thai.

Pittayaporn's Proto-Tai reconstructed consonantal syllable codas also include *-l, *-c, and possibly *-ɲ, which are not included in most prior reconstructions of Proto-Tai.: p. 193 Below is the consonantal syllabic coda inventory:

Norquest (2021) reconstructs the voiceless retroflex stop /ʈ/ for Proto-Tai. Examples of voiceless retroflex stops in Proto-Tai:

Norquest (2021) also reconstructs a series of breathy voiced initials (*bʱ, *dʱ, *ɡʱ, *ɢʱ) for Proto-Tai. Examples of breathy voiced initials in Proto-Tai:

Consonant clusters
Li (1977) reconstructs the following initial clusters:

Pittayaporn (2009) reconstructs two types of complex onsets for Proto-Tai:

Tautosyllabic clusters – considered one syllable.
Sesquisyllabic clusters – "one-and-a-half" syllables. ("Sesquisyllabic" is a term coined by James Matisoff.) However, sesquisyllabic clusters are not attested in any modern Tai language.

Tautosyllabic consonant clusters from Pittayaporn: p. 139 are given below, some of which have the medials *-r-, *-l-, and *-w-.

Pittayaporn's Proto-Tai reconstruction also has sesquisyllabic consonant clusters.  Michel Ferlus (1990) had also previously proposed sesquisyllables for Proto-Thai-Yay. The larger Tai-Kadai family is reconstructed with disyllabic words that ultimately collapsed to monosyllabic words in the modern Tai languages.  However, irregular correspondences among certain words (especially in the minority non-Southwestern-Tai languages) suggest to Pittayaporn that Proto-Tai had only reached the sesquisyllabic stage (with a main monosyllable and optional preceding minor syllable). The subsequent reduction to monosyllables occurred independently in different branches, with the resulting apparent irregularities in synchronic languages reflecting Proto-Tai sesquisyllables.

Examples of sesquisyllables include:

Voiceless stop + voiceless stop (*C̥.C̥-)
 *p.t-
 *k.t-
 *p.q-
 *q.p-

Voiceless obstruent + voiced stop (*C̥.C̬-)
 *C̥.b-
 *C̥.d-

Voiced obstruent + voiceless stop (*C̬.C̥-)
 *C̬.t-
 *C̬.k-
 *C̬.q-

Voiceless stops + liquids/glides (*C̥.r-)
 *k.r-
 *p.r-
 *C̥.w-

Voiced consonant + liquid/glide
 *m.l-
 *C̬ .r-
 *C̬ .l-

Clusters with non-initial nasals
 *t.n-
 *C̬ .n-

Other clusters include *r.t-, *t.h-, *q.s-, *m.p-, *s.c-, *z.ɟ-, *g.r-, *m.n-; *gm̩.r-, *ɟm̩ .r-, *c.pl-, *g.lw-; etc.

Vowels
Below are Proto-Tai vowels from Pittayaporn.: p. 192 Unlike Li's system, Pittayaporn's system has vowel length contrast. There is a total of 7 vowels with length contrast and 5 diphthongs.

The diphthongs from Pittayaporn (2009) are:
Rising: */iə/, */ɯə/, */uə/
Falling: */ɤɰ/, */aɰ/

Tones 

Proto-Tai had three contrasting tones on syllables ending with sonorant finals ("live syllables"), and no tone contrast on syllables with obstruent finals ("dead syllables").  This is very similar to the situation in Middle Chinese.  For convenience in tracking historical outcomes, Proto-Tai is usually described as having four tones, namely *A, *B, *C, and *D, where *D is a non-phonemic tone automatically assumed by all dead syllables. These tones can be further split into a voiceless (*A1 [1], *B1 [3], *C1 [5], *D1 [7]) and voiced (*A2 [2], *B2 [4], *C2 [6], *D2 [8]) series. The *D tone can also be split into the *DS (short vowel) and *DL (long vowel) tones. With voicing contrast, these would be *DS1 [7], *DS2 [8], *DL1 [9], and *DL2 [10]. Other Kra–Dai languages are transcribed with analogous conventions.

The following table of the phonetic characteristics of Proto-Tai tones was adapted from Pittayaporn.: p. 271 Note that *B and *D are phonetically similar.

Proto-Tai tones take on various tone values and contours in modern Tai languages. These tonal splits are determined by the following conditions:
"Friction sounds": Aspirated onset, voiceless fricative, voiceless sonorant
Unaspirated onset (voiceless)
Glottalized/implosive onset (voiceless)
Voiced onset (voiceless)

In addition, William J. Gedney developed a "tone-box" method to help determine historical tonal splits and mergers in modern Tai languages. There is a total of 20 possible slots in what is known as the Gedney's Tone Box.

Proto-Tai tones correspond regularly to Middle Chinese tones. (Note that Old Chinese did not have tones.) The following tonal correspondences are from Luo (2008). Note that Proto-Tai tone *B corresponds to Middle Chinese tone C, and vice versa.

Gedney (1972) also included a list of diagnostic words to determine tonal values, splits, and mergers for particular Tai languages. At least three diagnostic words are needed for each cell of the Gedney Box. The diagnostic words preceding the semicolons are from Gedney (1972), and the ones following the semicolons are from Somsonge (2012) and Jackson, et al. (2012). Standard Thai (Siamese) words are given below, with italicised transliterations.

Note that the diagnostic words listed above cannot all be used for other Tai-Kadai branches such as Kam–Sui, since tones in other branches may differ. The table below illustrates these differences among Tai and Kam–Sui etyma.

Proto-Southern Kra-Dai
In 2007, Peter K. Norquest undertook a preliminary reconstruction of Proto-Southern Kra-Dai, which is ancestral to the Hlai languages, Ong Be language, and Tai languages. There are 28 consonants, 5-7 vowels, 9 closed rimes (not including vowel length), and at least 1 diphthong, *ɯa(C).

Proto-Southern Kra-Dai medial consonants also include:

 *C(V)-m
 *C(V)-n
 *C(V)-ɲ
 *C(V)-ŋ
 *C(V)(i)l
 *C(u)r
 *p(i)l
 *k-l

Proto-Southern Kra-Dai also includes the diphthong *ɯa(C).

Syllable structure
Unlike its modern-day monosyllabic descendants, Proto-Tai was a sesquisyllabic language (Pittayaporn 2009). Below are some possible Proto-Tai syllable shapes from Pittayaporn.: p. 64

Legend:
C = consonant
V = vowel
(:) = optional vowel length
T = tone

During the evolution from Proto-Tai to modern Tai languages, monosyllabification involved a series of five steps.: p. 181
Weakening (segment becomes less "consonant-like")
Implosivization
Metathesis
Assimilation
Simplification (syllable drops at least one constituent)

Morphology

Robert M. W. Dixon (1998) suggests that the Proto-Tai language was fusional in its morphology because of related sets of words among the language's descendants that appear to be related through ablaut.

Syntax
Proto-Tai had a SVO (subject–verb–object) word order like Chinese and almost all modern Tai languages. Its syntax was heavily influenced by Chinese.

Lexical isoglosses
Examples of Kra-Hlai-Tai isoglosses as identified by Norquest (2021):

Examples of Hlai-Be-Tai isoglosses as identified by Norquest (2021):

Examples of Be-Tai isoglosses as identified by Norquest (2021):

See also
List of Proto-Tai reconstructions (Wiktionary)
Proto-Kra language
Proto-Hlai language
Proto-Austronesian language
Austro-Tai languages

References
Notes

Sources

 Gedney, William J., and Thomas J. Hudak. William J. Gedney's Southwestern Tai Dialects: Glossaries, Texts and Translations. [Ann Arbor, Mich.]: Center for South and Southeast Asian Studies, University of Michigan, 1994. Print.
 Thurgood, Graham. 2002. "A comment on Gedney's proposal for another series of voiced initials in Proto-Tai revisited." Studies in Southeast Asian Languages, edited by Robert Bauer. Pacific Linguistics. pp. 169–183. (updated 2006)

Further reading

 Akharawatthanakun, Phinnarat. (2010). Phonological Variation in Phuan. MANUSYA: Journal of Humanities, 13(2), 50-87.
 Brown, J. Marvin. From Ancient Thai to Modern Dialects. Bangkok: Social Science Association Press of Thailand, 1965.
 Ferlus, Michel. 1990. "Remarques sur le consonantisme de Proto Thai-Yay (Révision du pro tai de Li Fangkuei)." Paper presented at the 23 rd International Conference on Sino-Tibetan Languages and Linguistics. University of Texas at Arlington
 Gedney, William J. 1989. "Future directions in Comparative Tai Linguistics." Selected papers on Comparative Tai Studies, ed. by Robert J. Bickner, John Hartmann, Thomas John Hudak and Patcharin Peyasantiwong, 7-116. Ann Arbor: Center for Southeast Asian Studies, University of Michigan.
 Li, Fang-kuei. 1977. Handbook of Comparative Tai. Honolulu, Hawaii: University of Hawaiʼi Press.
Miyake, Marc. 2014. What the *-hɛːk is going on?
Miyake, Marc. 2014. Proto-Tai *j-, *ˀj-, or *ʄ-?.
Miyake, Marc. 2014. Is Thai yuan 'Vietnamese' a loanword from Lao?
Miyake, Marc. 2014. Tone codes: XK'G- + -vqhslc.
Miyake, Marc. 2014. Black and white evidence for Vietnamese phonological history.
Miyake, Marc. 2014. D-ou-b-led letters in Tai Viet.
Miyake, Marc. 2014. *(C).r-usters in Black Tai and Bao Yen.
Miyake, Marc. 2014.  S-implificaition in Black Tai and Bao Yen.
Miyake, Marc. 2013. Dyeing in the south: evidence for earlier Southern Chinese *-om.
Miyake, Marc. 2013. Saek.
Miyake, Marc. 2013. The other Kra-Dai numerals (Parts 1, 2).
Miyake, Marc. 2012. Pondering over water.
Miyake, Marc. 2012. 3itting on fire.
Miyake, Marc. 2012. Speaking of heaven in Zhuang.
Miyake, Marc. 2011. Can Proto-Tai live without *ʔy-(uu)?
Miyake, Marc. 2011. From 'you' to 'yuu'.
Miyake, Marc. 2011. The roots of rawness.
Miyake, Marc. 2011. Sawgun stratography?
Miyake, Marc. 2010. Brown's (1979) "Vowel length in Thai".
Miyake, Marc. 2010. Was there a *krp-orate cluster in 'cloth'?
Miyake, Marc. 2010. Lao x ex ... ?
Miyake, Marc. 2008. Proto-Tai 'nine': evidence for unexpected emphasis?
Miyake, Marc. 2008. Li Fang-kuei's Proto-Tai diphthongs.
Miyake, Marc. 2008. 布央 Cloth center consonants.
Miyake, Marc. 2008. A fiery theory.
Miyake, Marc. 2008. ƧЗЧƼƄ
Ostapirat, Weera. (2009). Proto-Tai and Kra-Dai Finals *-l and *-c. Journal of Language and Culture, 28(2), 41-56.
Ostapirat, Weera. (2013). The Rime System of Proto-Tai. Bulletin of Chinese Linguistics, 7(1), 189-227.
Pittayaporn, Pittayawat. 2008. "Proto-Southwestern Tai: A New Reconstruction". Paper presented at the 18th Annual Meeting of the Southeast Asian Linguistics Society. Universiti Kebangsaan Malaysia, Bangi.
Puttachart, P. & Thananan, T. (1998). The position of Tak Bai in Tai dialects. In S. Burusphat (Ed.), Proceedings of the International Conference on Tai Studies (pp. 313–322).
Sarawit, Mary. 1973. The Proto-Tai Vowel System. University of Michigan, Department of Linguistics: PhD dissertation.

External links
 ABVD: Proto-Tai word list
 ABVD: Proto-Southwestern Tai word list
 ABVD: word lists of Kra-Dai languages

Dictionaries
 Database query to Tai–Kadai etymology
 Thai Lexicography Resources

Tai languages
Tai